Subfischeria is a genus of parasitic flies in the family Tachinidae.

Species
Subfischeria flavogrisea Villeneuve, 1937

Distribution
Botswana, Malawi, Namibia, South Africa.

References

Monotypic Brachycera genera
Diptera of Africa
Dexiinae
Tachinidae genera
Taxa named by Joseph Villeneuve de Janti